Lists of the largest cities in Canada by population are lists by population of large cities in Canada that depend on the definition of "city". They include:

List of the largest municipalities in Canada by population, municipalities ranging from cities to rural districts.
List of the largest population centres in Canada, population centres (formerly urban areas) based on continuous population density, regardless of municipal boundaries.
List of census metropolitan areas and agglomerations in Canada, metropolitan areas as defined by Statistics Canada.

See also 
 List of largest Canadian cities by census, historical population data

Cities